Fesolai Apulu Tusiupu Tuigamala is a Samoan politician. He is a member of the FAST Party.

Fesolai was first elected to the Legislative Assembly of Samoa in the 2021 Samoan general election. Following the election an election petition against him was withdrawn. On 28 July 2021 he was appointed Associate Minister of Justice and Courts Administration. In his opening speech he called for overseas Samoans to be allowed to vote.

References

Living people
Members of the Legislative Assembly of Samoa
Faʻatuatua i le Atua Samoa ua Tasi politicians
Year of birth missing (living people)